Kvaran is a surname. Notable people with the surname include:

Brynjar Kvaran (born 1958), Icelandic handball player
Einar Hjörleifsson Kvaran (1859–1938), Icelandic editor, novelist, poet, playwright and spiritualist
Einar Ragnarsson Kvaran (1920–2012), Icelandic engineer, teacher, genealogist and writer
Gunnar Kvaran (born 1944), Icelandic cellist
Karl Kvaran (1924–1989), Icelandic painter and draughtsman